Dreamvision (paintings) is a series of 28 oil paintings made by Nabil Kanso in 1980–81. The subjects of the works in the series are two figures of a man and woman whose characters and relations are reinforced by figurative allusions to their surroundings.

References

External links
Dreamvision

Modern paintings
1980 paintings
Series of paintings by Nabil Kanso
1981 paintings